Sergente André Louis Bosson (1894–1918) was a French World War I flying ace credited with seven aerial victories, including one shared with Jean-Paul Favre de Thierrens.

Military service
Bosson began military service as a sapper on 6 September 1914. He would serve as such valorously until 1917. He would transfer to pilot's training, receiving his Military Pilot's Brevet on 25 September 1917.

Posted to Escadrille Spa62, he would score seven confirmed victories between 9 March and 4 June 1918. He was killed in action on 20 July 1918.

During his military career, he had earned both the Médaille Militaire and the Croix de Guerre.

Endnotes

References
 Franks, Norman; Bailey, Frank (1993). Over the Front: The Complete Record of the Fighter Aces and Units of the United States and French Air Services, 1914–1918. London, UK: Grub Street Publishing. .

1894 births
1918 deaths
French World War I flying aces
French military personnel killed in World War I